Groovin' High is a 1955 compilation album of studio sessions by jazz composer and trumpeter Dizzy Gillespie. The Rough Guide to Jazz describes the album as "some of the key bebop small-group and big band recordings."

Reception
Jazz critic Scott Yanow concedes that the music included is classic, but dismisses the compilation over-all as "so-so" because of its brevity, because of the outdated and lightweight liner notes and because the material presented does not represent the complete sessions at which the material was played. The compilation features Gillespie with a number of combinations and other musicians, including his 1946 big band, Charlie Parker, a sextet with Dexter Gordon and a combo featuring Sonny Stitt.

Track listing
"Blue 'n' Boogie" (Dizzy Gillespie, Frank Paparelli) – 3:00
"Groovin' High" (Gillespie) – 2:40
"Dizzy Atmosphere" (Gillespie) – 2:45
"All the Things You Are" (Oscar Hammerstein, Jerome Kern) – 2:52
"Hot House" (Tadd Dameron) – 2:27
"Salt Peanuts" (Kenny Clarke, Gillespie) – 2:20
"Oop Bop Sh'Bam" (Ray Brown, Gil Fuller, Gillespie) – 3:06
"That's Earl, Brother" (Brown, Fuller, Gillespie) – 2:55
"Things to Come" (Fuller, Gillespie) – 2:47
"One Bass Hit, Pt. 2" (Brown, Fuller, Gillespie) – 2:46
"Ray's Idea" (Brown, Fuller, Gillespie) – 3:09
"Our Delight" (Dameron) – 2:40
"Emanon" (Gillespie, Shaw) – 3:11

Personnel

Ray Abrams – tenor saxophone
Taswell Baird – trombone
John Brown – alto saxophone
Ray Brown – bass
Slam Stewart – bass
Dave Burns – trumpet
Scoops Carey – alto saxophone
Big Sid Catlett – drums
Kenny Clarke – drums
Cozy Cole – drums
Leon Cormenge – trombone
Talib Dawud – trumpet
Kenny Dorham – trumpet
Bill Frazier – saxophone
Dizzy Gillespie – trumpet, leader
Dexter Gordon – tenor saxophone
Al Haig – piano
Joe Harris – drums
Clyde Hart – piano
Milt Jackson – vibraphone
Howard E. Johnson – alto saxophone
Yujiro Kasai – remastering
John Lewis – piano
Warren Lucky – tenor saxophone
John Lynch – trumpet
Shelly Manne – drums
Matthew McKay – trumpet
Alton Moore – trombone
Raymond Orr – trumpet
Remo Palmieri – guitar
Frank Paparelli – piano
Charlie Parker – alto saxophone
Leo Parker – baritone saxophone
Curly Russell – bass
Murray Shipinski – bass
Sonny Stitt – alto saxophone
Gordon Thomas – trombone
Lucky Thompson – tenor saxophone
Rudy Van Gelder – remastering
Chuck Wayne – guitar
Elmon Wright – trumpet

References 

Dizzy Gillespie albums
Bebop albums
1955 compilation albums
Savoy Records compilation albums